Paremhat 28 - Coptic Calendar - Paremhat 30

The twenty-ninth day of the Coptic month of Paremhat, the seventh month of the Coptic year. In common years, this day corresponds to March 25, of the Julian Calendar, and April 7, of the Gregorian Calendar. This day falls in the Coptic Season of Shemu, the season of the Harvest. On this day, the Coptic church celebrates the Feast of the Annunciation, one of the Major Feasts of the Lord, as well as the annual commemoration of the Resurrection.

Commemorations

Feasts 

 The Feast of the Glorious Annunciation

Other commemorations 

 The annual commemoration of the Resurrection of Jesus Christ

References 

Days of the Coptic calendar